Ullmann's Encyclopedia of Industrial Chemistry is a major reference work related to industrial chemistry by Chemist Fritz Ullmann, first published in 1914, and exclusively in German as "Enzyklopädie der Technischen Chemie" until 1984.

History
Ullmann's Encyclopedia of Industrial Chemistry is a major reference work related to industrial chemistry by chemist Fritz Ullmann. Its 1st edition was published in German by Fritz Ullmann in 1914. The 4th edition, published 1972 to 1984, already contained 25 volumes. The 5th edition, published 1985 to 1996, was the first version available in English. In 1997, the first online version was published. 2014 marked its centenary.

As of 2016, Ullmann's Encyclopedia was in its 7th edition, in 40 volumes including one index volume and more than 1,050 articles (200 more than the 6th edition), approx. 30,000 pages, 22,000 images, 8,000 tables, 19,000 references and 85,000 indices.

Editions 

 1914–1922: 1st edition in 12 volumes, which can be viewed online (hosted by Internet Archive) 
 1928–1932: 2nd edition in 11 volumes
 1951–1970: 3rd edition in 22 volumes, of which volume 2 is in two sub-volumes
 1972–1984: 4th edition in 25 volumes, last edition in German language
 1985–1996: 5th edition, in English only, entitled Ullmann's Encyclopedia of Industrial Chemistry, in 36 volumes
 2002–2007: 6th edition in 40 volumes
 2011–2014: 7th edition in 40 print volumes, with ongoing changes and additions to the online edition

Editors and contributors 
Barbara Elvers (Wiley-VCH) is currently Senior Editorial Advisor and Claudia Ley is Editor-in-Chief, both Wiley-VCH. The Editorial Board has around 20 members from different nations.

The encyclopedia is a multi-author work. Around 3,000 international authors from universities and industry contributed to it.

Topics
Note: The 'topics' are a selection of related articles provided by Wiley Online Library. The number (#) indicates that, for example, 15 articles relate to the main branch of agrochemicals. The numbers do not exactly sum up to the total number of articles (1,050), but its sole purpose is for organizing and categorizing the large number of articles where possible.
Agrochemicals (15 articles)
 Analytical Techniques (30)
 Biochemistry & Biotechnology (26)
 Chemical Reactions (12)
 Dyes and Pigments (29)
 Energy (22)
 Environmental Protection and Industrial Safety(29)
 Fat, Oil, Food and Feed, Cosmetics (39)
 Inorganic Chemicals (71)
 Materials (33)
 Metals and Alloys (38)
 Organic Chemicals (114)
 Pharmaceuticals (77)
 Polymers and Plastics (57)
 Processes & Process Engineering (86)
 Renewable Resources (20)
 Special Topics (64)

Kirk-Othmer Encyclopedia of Chemical Technology 

In the 1940s, American Chemists Donald F. Othmer and Raymond E. Kirk from New York University began to create an English counterpart to Ullmann , named the Kirk-Othmer Encyclopedia of Chemical Technology. It was originally published by Wiley, which in 1996 took over the German Wiley-VCH publishing house and thus has combined the two encyclopedias ever since. The German chemistry magazine CHEManager wrote, quote: "In a double pack, the two companion works are simply unbeatable, because the knowledge gathered in both offers answers to (almost) all questions that can arise in connection with chemical products and processes.". These two encyclopedias were compared in Reference Reviews in 2007.

, Kirk-Othmer was in its 5th edition with more than 1,300 articles in 27 volumes with over 22,950 pages.

External links 

 Ullmann's Encyclopedia of Industrial Chemistry, 7th edition online - continuously updated (English)
 Ullmann's Encyclopedia of Industrial Chemistry, 7th edition print version
 Kirk-Othmer Encyclopedia of Chemical Technology, 5th edition online - continuously updated (English)
 Kirk-Othmer Encyclopedia of Chemical Technology, 5.th edition print version

References

Chemistry books
Chemical engineering books
Encyclopedias of science
Chemical industry
20th-century encyclopedias